

The CAC Fox is a small UAV developed in France for use as a reconnaissance aircraft and for electronic warfare. About a thousand have been sold in a number of variants, with generally similar appearance and specifications.

The Fox-TX can carry a variety of payloads for radar or radio communications jamming; radar identification and location; communications intercept; or, when fitted with a warhead and a radar-homing seeker, anti-radar attack. The Fox-TX can also carry two small underwing stores.

Variants
 Fox-AT1 - Short range battlefield reconnaissance variant. Unlike the Fox-TX, the Fox-AT1 has a skid to permit belly landings. It can carry four small underwing stores. Endurance is only an hour and a half. French forces have used the Fox-AT1 for tactical reconnaissance in the Balkans.
 Fox-AT2 - Long range battlefield reconnaissance variant. The Fox-AT2 looks much like the Fox-AT1, but has the wider 4-meter wingspan.
 Fox-TS1 - Expendable target, with the short 3.6 meter wingspan. It can carry chaff, flares, radar enhancement devices, and other target gear.

Specifications (Fox-TX)

References
 Jane's International Defence Review

This article contains material that originally came from the web article Unmanned Aerial Vehicles by Greg Goebel, which exists in the Public Domain.

1990s French military reconnaissance aircraft
Unmanned military aircraft of France
Fox